Live from Hawaii: The Farewell Concert is the second and final live album from the Christian rock band Audio Adrenaline. The concert was recorded during the band's final presentation on April 28, 2007 at Waikiki Shell in Honolulu, Hawaii. It was released on August 28, 2007 by ForeFront Records.

The album includes many special moments during certain songs, one including Mark Stuart's father, and another including Logan Sekulow, of the Christian music talk show The Logan Shows, proposing to his girlfriend. Special features include behind-the-scenes looks and band interviews and stories. Guest appearance by MercyMe at the end.

Reception

The album received favorable reviews from critics. John DiBiase, of Jesus Freak Hideout, gave it 4 stars out of 5. He criticized lead singer Mark Stuart's vocals qualifying them as "noticeably poor... due to Mark Stuart's vocal ailments. It's evident here as to why Stuart had to hang up the mic." However, DiBiase still praised the project overall calling it "a project that fans can embrace as the final 'hoorah' for one of Christian rock's finest."

Accolades
The album received two nominations at the 39th GMA Dove Awards: Rock Album of the Year and Long Form Music Video of Year, winning the latter.

Track listing

DVD

 "Clap Your Hands"
 "Worldwide"
 "Mighty Good Leader"
 "Big House"
 "Until My Heart Caves In"
 "Hands and Feet"
 "Ocean Floor"
 "Leaving 99"
 "We're A Band" (Featuring T-Bone)
 "Beautiful"
 "Underdog"
 "Get Down"
 "DC-10"
 "King"
 "Goodbye"

Personnel
 Mark Stuart – lead vocals
 Tyler Burkum – guitars, lead vocals
 Will McGinniss – bass, vocals
 Ben Cissell – drums, percussion, vocals
Brian Whitman – guest guitarist

References

Audio Adrenaline albums
2007 live albums
2007 video albums
Live video albums
ForeFront Records live albums
ForeFront Records video albums
Christian live video albums